Maddison Allen (born 3 July 1993) is an Australian professional basketball player.

College
Allen began her college career at California Polytechnic State University in San Luis Obispo, California, playing for the Mustangs. After her second year of eligibility, Allen would then transfer to Santa Clara University in Santa Clara, California where she would join the Broncos.

Statistics 

|-
| style="text-align:left;"| 2012–13
| style="text-align:left;"| California Poly
| 8 || 0 || 13.5 || .375 || .000 || .636 || 2.5 || 0.1 || 0.5 || 1.3 || 0.5 || 2.4
|-
| style="text-align:left;"| 2013–14
| style="text-align:left;"| California Poly
| 22 || 10 || 16.7 || .407 || .000 || .647 || 5.1 || 1.0 || 0.3 || 1.1 || 1.5 || 3.5
|-
| style="text-align:left;"| 2014–15
| style="text-align:left;"| Santa Clara
| 27 || 8 || 14.5 || .452 || .000 || .533 || 3.6 || 0.4 || 0.3 || 1.2 || 1.1 || 3.7
|-
| style="text-align:left;"| 2015–16
| style="text-align:left;"| Santa Clara
|colspan="12"|Injured
|-
| style="text-align:center;" colspan="2"| Career
| 57 || 18 || 15.2 || .425 || .000 || .545 || 4.0 || 0.6 || 0.3 || 1.2 || 1.1 || 3.4

Career

WNBL
Allen would begin her professional career with the Canberra Capitals after signing for the 2016–17 WNBL season. After joining the Capitals, Allen would play alongside the likes of Marianna Tolo and Carly Wilson.

In 2018, Allen would return to the league after signing a full-time contract with the Perth Lynx for the 2018–19 season. Allen was picked up by the Lynx after strong showings with the Rockingham Flames in the SBL. In her first season with the Lynx, Allen was one of the league's leading shot blockers and she would also make her WNBL Finals debut.

National Team

Youth Level
In 2010, Allen made her international debut for the Sapphires during an international series against Japan ahead of the World Championships that year. Allen was not named to the final roster for the Under-17 World Championship in France.

References

1993 births
Living people
Australian women's basketball players
Canberra Capitals players
Perth Lynx players
Forwards (basketball)
Centers (basketball)
People educated at John Paul College (Brisbane)